Dick Staples (8 January 1878 – 13 August 1954) was a New Zealand cricketer. He played in four first-class matches for Wellington from 1901 to 1904.

See also
 List of Wellington representative cricketers

References

External links
 

1878 births
1954 deaths
New Zealand cricketers
Wellington cricketers
Cricketers from Wellington City